Shults-Lewis School is a private school located in Valparaiso, Indiana, USA.

See also
 List of high schools in Indiana

References

External links
 Official website

Buildings and structures in Porter County, Indiana
1991 establishments in Indiana